The Beijing Auto Museum is an automotive museum in Beijing, China, which opened in 2011. With 50,000 square meters and 5 floors, it is the largest auto museum in China.

History
The Beijing Auto Museum began construction in 2006, and the building was completed in 2010. It was officially opened to the public the next year, in 2011.

On May 18, 2019, the Beijing Auto Museum was recognized by the Chinese Museum Association out of over 5,000 other museums in the country as the "most innovative museum in China".

Collection
In 2014, the collection of cars in the Beijing Auto Museum numbered 80. However, several of the cars in the collection are replicas, such as the Benz Patent-Motorwagen. Domestic vehicles on display include state cars from Hongqi, military jeeps from Beijing Automobile Works, and replica Dongfanghong and Dongfeng civilian cars.

References

Automotive museums
2011 establishments in China
Museums in China